The 1912 North Dakota Agricultural Aggies football team was an American football team that represented North Dakota Agricultural College (now known as North Dakota State University) as an independent during the 1912 college football season. In its fourth season under head coach Arthur Rueber, the team compiled a 5–1 record and outscored opponents by a total of 200 to 6.

Schedule

References

North Dakota Agricultural
North Dakota State Bison football seasons
North Dakota Agricultural Aggies football